Raziabad-e Pain (also Romanized as Raẕīābād-e Pā’īn and Raẕīābād Pā’īn) is a village in Razakan Rural District, in the Central District of Shahriar County, Tehran Province, Iran. At the 2006 census, its population was 1,940, in 500 families.

References 

Populated places in Shahriar County